Melchor may refer to the following people
Given name
Melchor Bravo de Saravia (1512–1577), Spanish conquistador, interim viceroy of Peru, and Royal Governor of Chile
Melchor Cano (1509–1560), Spanish Scholastic theologian
Melchor Casco de Mendoza (1581–1658), Spanish nobleman
Melchor Chavez (born 1951) Filipino politician
Melchor Cob Castro (born 1968), Mexican boxer 
Melchor Concha y Toro (1833–1892), Chilean businessman, lawyer, and politician
Melchor de Aguilera, 17th century Spanish governor of Cartagena
Melchor de Marchena (1907–1980), Spanish flamenco guitarist
Melchor de Mediavilla y Azcona, governor of Texas between 1727 and 1731
Melchor de Navarra, Duke of Palata (1626–1691), Spanish politician
Melchor de Navarrete (1693–1761), Spanish soldier and administrator
Melchor de Talamantes (1765–1809), Mexican friar and priest
Melchior Díaz, an early Spanish explorer of Western North America
Melchor Feliú, 18th century Florida governor
Melchor Fernández Almagro (1893–1966), Spanish writer, historian, journalist and literary critic
Melchor José Ramos (1805–1832), Chilean political figure and journalist
Melchor Liñán y Cisneros (1629—1708), Spanish Roman Catholic prelate
Melchor López (born 1913), Argentinean sports shooter
Melchor Menor (born 1974), American kickboxer 
Melchor Múzquiz (1790–1844), Mexican soldier and politician
Melchor Ocampo (1814–1861), Mexican lawyer, scientist, and liberal politician
Melchor Palmeiro (born 1923), Argentinean runner
Melchor Peredo (born 1927), Mexican muralist
Melchor Portocarrero, 3rd Count of Monclova (1636–1705), viceroy of New Spain 
Melchor Rodríguez García (1893—1972), Spanish politician and statesman
Melchor Sánchez de la Fuente (born 1963), Mexican politician 
Melchor Saucedo (1920–2014), bishop of the Episcopal Diocese of Western Mexico
Melchor Soria Vera (died 1643, Spanish Roman Catholic prelate
Melchor Yap (born 1940), Filipino sports shooter

Surname
Alejandro Melchor (1900–1947), Filipino civil engineer, mathematician, educator and politician
Cruz Melchor Eya Nchama (born 1945), a judge at the Court of Geneva
Federico Melchor (1915–1985), Spanish journalist and communist politician
Inés Melchor (born 1986), Peruvian long-distance runner
José Melchor (born 1990), Mexican professional footballer
Traci Melchor, Canadian television personality

See also
Melchor Acompañado - a filipino salesman, businessman and an incorporator of JEM TRONICS SOLUTION INC. Raised by his parents Emiliana Acompañado and Miguel Acompañado of Hindang,Leyte, Philippines